Philip James Alexander (born 4 September 1962) is an English former association footballer and American footballer who is the CEO of Bristol City.

Association football
Alexander's English football career began at Reading. Alexander then joined amateur Wokingham Town, before signing for Norwich City for £2,000 in 1981.

American football
Alexander played for Farnham Knights and London Monarchs as a kicker. In the Monarchs first year he was "Operation Discovery Player of the year", was voted to the All World League team and was the first Brit to get his hands on the World Bowl trophy.

Executive career
Alexander was appointed chief executive of Crystal Palace in 1996, In December 2022 he was appointed CEO at Bristol City.

References

External links
 Former Chief Executive Phil Alexander joins Bristol City F.C.
 Phil Alexander appointed new CEO

1962 births
Living people
English footballers
American football placekickers
Crystal Palace F.C. directors and chairmen
Association football defenders
English players of American football
Footballers who switched code
English Football League players
Wokingham Town F.C. players
Norwich City F.C. players
Miramar Rangers AFC players
London Monarchs players
Bracknell Town F.C. players
English football managers
Bracknell Town F.C. managers
English expatriate footballers
English expatriate sportspeople in New Zealand
Expatriate association footballers in New Zealand